The College Scholastic Ability Test or CSAT, also abbreviated Suneung, is a standardized test which is recognized by South Korean universities. The Korea Institute of Curriculum and Evaluation (KICE) administers the annual test on the third Thursday in November. In 2020, however, it was postponed to the first Thursday in December (December 3), due to the COVID-19 pandemic.

Although the CSAT was originally designed to assess the scholastic ability required for college, it is currently a national graduation test for high-school students. By determining the university a student can enter, it plays an important role in South Korean education. The test has been cited for its efficiency, emphasis on merit, and good international results. Of the students taking the test, 20 percent are high-school graduates who did not achieve their desired score the previous year.

On test day, the KRX stock market opens late, and bus and metro service is increased to avoid traffic jams and allow students to get to the testing sites more easily. Planes are grounded during the listening portion of the English section so their noise does not disturb the students. In some cases, students running late for the test may be escorted to their testing site by police officers via motorcycle. Younger students and members of the students' families gather outside testing sites to cheer them on.

Purpose 
The CSAT is designed to test a candidate's ability to study in college, with questions based on Korea's high-school curriculum. It standardizes high-school education and provides accurate, objective data for university admission.

Schedule 
All questions are multiple-choice, except for the 9 questions in the Mathematics section, which are short answer.

Sections 

The CSAT consists of six sections: national language (Korean), mathematics, English, Korean history, subordinate subjects (social studies, sciences, and vocational education), and second foreign language/Chinese characters and classics. All sections are optional except Korean history, but most candidates take all the other sections except second foreign language/Classical Chinese. 

In the mathematics section, candidates are made to take Math I (which consists of Logarithm, Sequences and Trigonometry) and Math II (which consists of Limits and Calculus on polynomials), and allowed to select one among Probability and Statistics, Geometry and Calculus.

The subordinate subjects is divided into three sections: social studies, science, and vocational education. Candidates may choose up to two subjects, but may not select from different sections at the same time; Physics II and Biology I may be chosen for the subordinate section since both are sciences, but World history and Principles of Accounting may notthe former is in the social studies section, and the latter in vocational education. Only vocational high-school graduates can choose the vocational education section. 

In the second foreign language/Classical Chinese section, the candidate chooses one subject. 

Most high-ranked universities require applicants to take two science subordinate subjects and Geometry or Calculus in the mathematics section if they apply for a STEM major, and do not accept subordinate subjects in the same field (such as Physics I and Physics II).

National Language 
In the National Language section, candidates are assessed on their ability to read, understand and analyse Korean texts rapidly and accurately. Its 45 questions of the subject are classified into four categories:

Common topics
 Questions 1-17: Reading
 Questions 18-34: Literature
Elective topics (select 1 out of 2 options, Q35-45)
 Speech and Writing
 Language and Media

Common subjects

Reading 
This category consists of four articles, from the topics reading theory, humanities/arts, law/economy and science/technology. Each passage has 3-6 questions. Candidates need to answer questions such as, "Of the five statements below, which one does not agree with the passage above?" or "According to the passage, which one is the correct analysis of the following example?"

Literature 
This category consists of texts from five categories: modern poetry, classic poetry, modern novel, classical prose and play/essay. Candidates may be asked to summarise a single passage or outline a common theme between multiple texts (sometimes of different text types), among many other question types.

Elective subjects

Speech and writing 
This category consists of 11 questions relating to three texts.

Language and Media 
Language forms questions 35-39 and relates to four topics: phonology, syntax, morphology and history of Korean. An additional topic may be used to complete the required five, or two questions are taken from morphology or syntax. Media forms questions 40-45 and relates to the characteristics of media and the creation of an online post or message.

Mathematics 
All mathematics candidates take the Maths I and II and select one elective topic from three choices: Calculus, Geometry or Probability and Statistics. Calculus is most preferred by students applying for natural science majors, while Probability and Statistics are preferred by students applying for the humanities. Geometry is the least popular, with only 4.1% of students selecting it as their elective. 

The Ga and Na type system was abolished from 2022 onwards, which means that students applying for the natural-sciences majors no longer have to study all three topics.

Subordinate subjects 

 Second foreign Language/Classical Chinese
 German I
 French I
 Spanish I
 Chinese I
 Japanese I
 Russian I
 Arabic I
 Vietnamese I
 Classical Chinese I

Writing of the test 

The test is written in September each year by about 500 South Korean teachers through a secretive process in an undisclosed location in Gangwon. The test writers are prohibited from communicating with the outside world.

Administration 

High-school graduates and students about to graduate high school may take the test. After the KICE prints test papers and OMR cards, they are distributed three days before the test to each test area. In 2018, there were 85 test areas.

Test monitors are middle- or high-school teachers. Superintendents of each education office decide who will monitor and where they will go. There are two test monitors for each period, except for the fourth period (which has three, because of test-paper collection). Most testing rooms are high-school classrooms, and there is a 28-candidate limit in each room.

Except for the English and Korean-history sections, grades are based on a stanine curve. Grade, percentile, and a standard score for each section and subject are added to the transcript. The standard score is calculated by the following formula:

 is the candidate's original score.  is the average of the original  candidate scores.  is the candidate's standard deviation.

Examples 

Although the CSAT is compared to the US SAT, their relative importance is different.

Mathematics 
Since CSAT problems are designed for all high school students, its overall difficulty is not too high. But some of them can be very tricky, which are so-called 'killer problems'. Here are some killer problems that were on the test.

A) For all real numbers , such that , .

C)  has more local extrema than  does.

.

English 

The following question appeared on 2010 CSAT, and had a correct-response rate of 9.77 percent. The paragraph is excerpted from John Leofric Stocks' "The Limits of Purpose":So far as you are wholly concentrated on bringing about a certain result, clearly, the quicker and easier it is brought about the better. Your resolve to secure a sufficiency of food for yourself and your family will induce you to spend weary days in tilling the ground and tending livestock; but if Nature provided food and meat in abundance ready for the table, you would thank Nature for sparing you much labor and consider yourself so much the better off. An executed purpose, in short, is a transaction in which the time and energy spent on the execution are balanced against the resulting assets, and the ideal case is one in which__. Purpose, then, justifies the efforts it exacts only conditionally, by their fruits.

 demand exceeds supply, resulting in greater returns
 life becomes fruitful with our endless pursuit of dreams
 the time and energy are limitless and assets are abundant
 Nature does not reward those who do not exert efforts
 the former approximates to zero and the latter to infinity

Preliminary College Scholastic Ability Test
The Preliminary College Scholastic Ability Test (PCSAT) is administered nationally. The relationship between PCSAT and CSAT is comparable to that between the PSAT and the SAT in the United States. The PCSAT is divided into two categories: the National United Achievement Tests (NUAT) and the College Scholastic Ability Test Simulation (CSAT Simulation). These tests are more similar to the CSAT than privately-administered mock tests, since the PCSAT's examiner committee is similar to that of the CSAT. The CSAT Simulation is hosted by the same institution as the CSAT, and is used to predict the level of difficulty or types of questions which might appear on that year's CSAT.

Although the NUAT and the CSAT Simulation are similar to the CSAT in their number of candidates, types of questions and relative difficulty, the NUAT is hosted by the Ministry of Education for high-school students. The CSAT Simulation is run by KICE and may be taken by anyone who is eligible for the CSAT. Both exams are reliable, official mock tests for the CSAT, and both are graded by the KICE.

National United Achievement Test
The National United Achievement Test (NUAT) is administered in the same way as the CSAT, and was introduced in 2002 to relieve dependence on private mock tests. High-school students may apply to take the test, and local education offices decide whether it will be administered in their districts. Every office of education in South Korea normally participates in the NUAT to prepare students for the CSAT, and the number of applicants parallels the CSAT. The Seoul Metropolitan Office of Education, Busan Metropolitan Office of Education (freshmen and sophomores), Gyeonggi-do Office of Education, and Incheon Office of Education take turns creating the questions, and the KICE grades the test and issues report cards.

The basic structure of the exam is identical to the CSAT. For mathematics, social studies, science and second language, its range is determined by when it is conducted. In the Korean and English sections, the questions are not directly from textbooks but are constructed in accordance with the curriculum.

As of 2014, there are four NUATs per year; it is not the same for every district, however, and some have only two exams per year for freshmen and sophomores. The NUAT for freshmen and sophomores is held in March, June, September and November; seniors are tested in March, April, July and October to avoid conflict with June and September, when the CSAT Simulation is given.

Administering institutions
 March: Seoul Metropolitan Office of Education (seniors; freshmen and sophomores, 2006–2009, 2014), Busan Metropolitan Office of Education (freshmen and sophomores, 2010–2013)
 April: Gyeonggi-do Office of Education (seniors, since 2003)
 June: Busan Metropolitan Office of Education (freshmen and sophomores, 2014), Seoul Metropolitan Office of Education (freshmen and sophomores 2002–2004, 2010–2013; seniors 2002), Incheon Office of Education (freshmen and sophomores 2005–2009)
 July: Incheon Office of Education (seniors since 2007), Seoul Metropolitan Office of Education (2005)
 September: Incheon Office of Education (freshmen and sophomores since 2010), Seoul Metropolitan Office of Education (freshmen and sophomores 2004–2008), Busan Metropolitan Office of Education (freshmen and sophomores 2009)
 October: Seoul Metropolitan Office of Education (seniors)
 November: Gyeonggi-do Office of Education (freshmen and sophomores, except 2003)
 December: Seoul Metropolitan Office of Education (freshmen 2003)

College Scholastic Ability Test Simulation
The College Scholastic Ability Test Simulation (CSAT Simulation) is given by KICE. Unlike the NUAT, anyone who is eligible for the CSAT may also take this test. The CSAT Simulation was introduced after the CSAT failed to set the proper difficulty level in 2001 and 2002. First implemented in 2002, it was held only in September during its early years. The test has been given twice a year, in June and September, since 2004. It covers everything in the curriculum for the Korean- and second-language sections, and two-thirds of what the CSAT covers for the other sections. The September exam covers everything in every section, like the CSAT. The number of questions and test time per section is identical to the CSAT.

History 
Since the liberation of Korea, South Korea has changed its methods of university and college admission from twelve to sixteen times. The policies ranged from allowing colleges to choose students to outlawing hagwons. Parents and students have had difficulty adjusting to the changes. The changes have been cited as evidence of systemic instability and the sensitivity of the admission process to public opinion.

University and college admissions were first left to the universities, and the first CSAT incarnation appeared at the beginning of 1960. The Supreme Council for National Reconstruction established an early CSAT from 1962 to 1963 as a qualification test for students. Due to the small number of students passing the test, colleges soon had a student shortage. The admissions process was criticized as inefficient, and the government scrapped the policy from 1964 to 1968. A similar policy was adopted in 1969 by the Third Republic of Korea, and the new test was the Preliminary College Entrance Examination (대학입학예비고사); it continued, mostly unchanged, until 1981. That year, the policy was significantly changed. The test name was changed to Preliminary College Preparations Examination (대학예비고사), and hagwons (cram schools) were outlawed. In 1982, the test name was changed again to College Entrance Strength Test (대입학력고사).

The current CSAT system was established in 1993, and has undergone several revisions since then. In 2004, the government of South Korea introduced a 2008 College Admissions Change Proposal; however, it failed to bring about significant changes.

Present day 
The test, based on national-standard textbooks, is designed to encourage cognitive skills. The Korea Institute of Curriculum and Evaluation creates the problems, prints and corrects the tests, supervises the test-making, and sets the test fee. The problems are created by KICE members who are university professors and high-school teachers. Two groups make the problems: one creates them, and the other checks them. The creators are primarily professors, although high-school teachers have been included since 2000. The problem-checkers are high-school teachers. Both groups sign non-disclosure agreements with the KICE. In 2012, there was a total of 696 staff members involved in creating the problems. A member of the group earns about $300 per day.

The 2016 subjects were national language, mathematics, English, Korean history, social studies/science/vocational education, and foreign language/Hanja. Although students may choose all (or some) of the subjects, Korean history is required.

Social studies is divided into life and ethics, ethics and ideologies, Korean geography, world geography, East Asian history, world history, law and politics, society and culture, and economics; students may choose two subjects. In the science section, students can choose two subjects from Physics 1 and 2, Chemistry 1 and 2, Biology 1 and 2, and Earth Science 1 and 2. Vocational education is divided into agricultural science, industry, commerce, oceanography, and home economics; students must choose one subject. However, vocational education may only be taken if the student has completed 80 percent of the expert studies. Foreign language is divided into German 1, French 1, Spanish 1, Chinese 1, Japanese 1, Russian 1, Arabic 1, basic Vietnamese, and Classical Chinese 1. Students can choose one subject.

After the test, the administrators collect, scan and correct them. The test correction (confirming the documentation and grades) and printing the results take about one month. However, test takers sometimes use unofficial websites to figure out how well they performed soon after taking the test.

The test is taken seriously and day-to-day operations are halted or delayed on test day. Many shops, flights, military training, construction projects, banks, and other activities and establishments are closed or canceled. The KRX stock market opens late. Neither students nor administrators may bring in cell phones, books, newspapers, food, or any other material which could distract other test-takers. Most complaints after the test involve administrator actions such as talking, opening windows, standing in front of a desk, sniffling, clicking a computer mouse, eating candy, and walking. Administrators are warned against doing anything which could distract students in any way.

Pressure to perform well on the CSAT has been linked to psychological stress, depression and suicide. The highly competitive exam is also cited as a contributing factor to South Korea's declining birth rate, as parents feel pressure to pay for expensive hagwon cram schools to help their children study. Critics also say that students from wealthier families have an advantage due to the prevalence of cram schools, and that the test detracts from students' education with its emphasis on rote memorization and topics that are distinct from the curriculum followed in schools.

Number of applicants

See also
Education in South Korea
List of universities and colleges in South Korea
College admissions in South Korea
Programme for International Student Assessment
Trends in International Mathematics and Science Study

Notes

References

External links 
 Ministry of Education, Science, and Technology
 Korea Institute for Curriculum and Evaluation
 College Scholastic Ability Test
 

1960 establishments in South Korea
1964 disestablishments in South Korea
1969 establishments in South Korea
Academic pressure in East Asian culture
Education in South Korea
Standardized tests